Soliera is a comune (municipality) in the Province of Modena in the Italian region Emilia-Romagna, located about  northwest of Bologna and about  north of Modena.  

Soliera borders the following municipalities: Bastiglia, Bomporto, Carpi, Modena, San Prospero.

Twin towns
Soliera is twinned with:

  Paiporta, Spain

References

External links
 Official website

Cities and towns in Emilia-Romagna